Steven Ryuma Hobbs (born February 12, 1970) is an American military officer and politician serving as the 16th Secretary of State of Washington since 2021. A member of the Democratic Party, he previously served as a member of the Washington State Senate, representing the 44th district from 2007 to 2021. In 2021, Governor Jay Inslee named Hobbs to succeed the departing Kim Wyman as Secretary of State of Washington; he is the first Democrat in the state to serve in the position since Victor Aloysius Meyers left it in 1965.

Political career 
In 2006, Hobbs was elected as state senator representing Washington's 44th Legislative District. He served as the top Democrat on the Transportation Committee, he also served on the Financial Institutions & Insurance Committee as well as the Agriculture, Water & Rural Economic Development Committee.

In 2015, Hobbs led the bipartisan Joint Transportation Committee in passing transportation revenue package brought a $16 billion investment to public infrastructure and authorized voter-approved Sound Transit light rail expansion. After finishing fourth in the 2016 Washington lieutenant gubernatorial election, Hobbs announced a campaign for the 2020 election, but withdrew in mid-May 2020.

Governor Jay Inslee named Hobbs to succeed the departing Kim Wyman as Secretary of State of Washington; Hobbs took office on November 22, 2021. He subsequently won a 2022 special election to complete the remainder of Wyman's term.

Public Service Honors 
 2014 President's Appreciation Award, Dairy Federation
 2014 Certificate of Commendation, Washington Farm Bureau
 2014 Power of Choice Award, NARAL Pro-Choice Washington
 2014 Honorary Member of the Year, PSE
 2013 Legislator of the Year, Washington Low Income Housing Alliance
 2013 Proud Partner Award, Washington State Housing Finance Commission
 2013 Department of Defense Certificate of Appreciation
 2012 Housing Hero, Housing Consortium of Everett and Snohomish County
 2012 Legislative Recognition Award, Public School Employees of Washington
 2012 Bringing Washington Home Advocacy Award, Washington Low-Income Housing Alliance
 2011 Legislator of the Year, The Aerospace Futures Alliance
 2011 Matson Award, Association of Washington Business
 2010 Pioneer Educator
 2010 NAACP Distinguished Armed Services Award
 2010 Farm Bureau, Friend of Farm Bureau Award
 2010 WASA Region Certificate of Achievement
 2009 Housing Hero, Snohomish County Camano Association of Realtors
 2009 Certificate of Appreciation, American Legion 96 Snohomish County
 2008-2010 Legislator of the Year, Washington Association for Career and Technical Education
 2008 Legislator of the Year, Washington Council of Police and Sheriffs
 2007 Super Star Award, Washington State Skills Center
 2007-2009 Business Champion, Joint Snohomish County Chambers of Commerce
 2007-2008 Legislative Leadership Award, Statewide Poverty Action Network
 Commanders Award, Disabled American Veterans Dept. of Washington

Military career 
Hobbs enlisted in the US Army as private at the age of 17. He served two tours of duty in Kosovo and Iraq, respectively. During his time as an infantry officer, Hobbs took on many roles including:
 Platoon leader during peacekeeping operations in Kosovo
 Brigade Staff Officer for 1st Brigade—Armored Division
 Executive Officer for Headquarters Company—1 -36 Infantry
 Company Commander—Delta Company—2-34 Infantry
 Security Officer—Anti-Terrorism Protection Cell—Multi-National Force Iraq
He is currently a lieutenant colonel in the US Army National Guard where he is Commander of Joint Force Headquarters Washington Army National Guard.

Education
Hobbs has received an associate degree from Everett Community College. After completing his associate degree, he attended the University of Washington, where he earned a bachelor's degree in political science and a Master's of Public Administration from the Daniel J. Evans School of Public Policy and Governance.

Personal life 
Hobbs, whose mother is of Japanese descent, was born in Everett, Washington. Hobbs has been married to Pam Hobbs since 1995. They reside in Lake Stevens, Washington with their three sons.

References

External links
Profile on the Washington State Legislature Official Website
Campaign website

1970 births
21st-century American politicians
American military personnel of Japanese descent
American politicians of Japanese descent
Asian-American people in Washington (state) politics
Living people
Evans School of Public Policy and Governance alumni
Everett Community College alumni
National Guard (United States) officers
Secretaries of State of Washington (state)
University of Washington College of Arts and Sciences alumni
Democratic Party Washington (state) state senators